As You Like It is a William Shakespeare-themed studio album released by Canadian band Barenaked Ladies on June 3, 2005. The album was recorded for the Stratford Shakespeare Festival of 2005. This CD was only made available at the festival.

Track listing
All lyrics by William Shakespeare. All songs arranged by Steven Page, except where noted.

Personnel
Barenaked Ladies
Jim Creeggan – bass guitar, vocals, double bass
Kevin Hearn – mandolin, piano, accordion, keyboards, vocals, vibraphone
Steven Page – acoustic guitar, electric guitar, vocals
Ed Robertson – acoustic guitar, electric guitar, vocals
Tyler Stewart – percussion, drums, vocals

Production
Engineer: Antonio Cimolino
Mixing: Paul Forgues, Steven Page
Designer: Santo Loquasto
Choreographer: Donna Feore
Assistant: Paul Forgues
Lighting designer: Steven Hawkins
Fight Director: John Stead
Sound designer: Jim Neil
Artwork: Little C at Artwerks

References

2005 albums
Barenaked Ladies albums